Irving Howe (June 11, 1920 – May 5, 1993) was an American literary and social critic and a prominent figure of the Democratic Socialists of America.

Early years
Howe was born as Irving Horenstein in The Bronx, New York. He was the son of Jewish immigrants from Bessarabia, Nettie (née Goldman) and David Horenstein, who ran a small grocery store that went out of business during the Great Depression. His father became a peddler and eventually a presser in a dress factory. His mother was an operator in the dress trade.

Howe attended City College of New York and graduated in 1940, alongside Daniel Bell and Irving Kristol; by the summer of 1940, he had changed his name to Howe for political (as distinct from official) purposes. While at school, he was constantly debating socialism, Stalinism, fascism, and the meaning of Judaism. He served in the US Army during World War II. Upon his return, he began writing literary and cultural criticism for the CIA-backed Partisan Review and became a frequent essayist for Commentary, politics, The Nation, The New Republic, and The New York Review of Books. In 1954, Howe helped found the intellectual quarterly Dissent, which he edited until his death in 1993. In the 1950s Howe taught English and Yiddish literature at Brandeis University in Waltham, Massachusetts. He used the Howe and Greenberg Treasury of Yiddish Stories as the text for a course on the Yiddish story, when few were spreading knowledge or appreciation of the works in American colleges and universities.

Political career

Since his City College days, Howe was committed to left-wing politics. He was a committed democratic socialist throughout his life. He was a member of the Young People's Socialist League, joining it in the 1930s when it was under the influence of the Trotskyist Socialist Workers Party, remaining with YPSL when it became the youth organization of Max Shachtman's Workers Party in 1940, which he served in a leading capacity, for a time as the editor of its paper, Labor Action; he continued his activism with this political trend when it morphed into the Independent Socialist League 1949, but left this milieu later in the mid 1950s.

At the request of his friend, Michael Harrington, he helped cofound the Democratic Socialist Organizing Committee in the early 1970s. DSOC merged into the Democratic Socialists of America in 1982, with Howe a vice-chair.

He was a vociferous opponent of both Soviet totalitarianism and McCarthyism, called into question standard Marxist doctrine, and came into conflict with the New Left after he criticized their unmitigated radicalism. Later in life, his politics gravitated toward more pragmatic democratic socialism and foreign policy, a position still represented in Dissent.

He had a few famous run-ins with people. In the 1960s while at Stanford University, he was verbally attacked by a young radical socialist, who claimed Howe was no longer committed to the revolution and that he had become status quo. Howe turned to the student and said, "You know what you're going to be? You're going to be a dentist."

Writer
Known for literary criticism as well as social and political activism, Howe wrote critical biographies on Thomas Hardy, William Faulkner, and Sherwood Anderson, a booklength examination of the relation of politics to fiction, and theoretical essays on Modernism, the nature of fiction, and social Darwinism.

He was also among the first to re-examine the work of Edwin Arlington Robinson and lead the way to establishing Robinson's reputation as one of the 20th century's great poets. His writing portrayed his dislike of capitalist America.

He wrote many influential books throughout his career, such as Decline of the New, World of our Fathers, Politics and the Novel and his autobiography A Margin of Hope. He also wrote a biography of Leon Trotsky, who was one of his childhood heroes.

Howe's exhaustive multidisciplinary history of Eastern European Jews in America, World of Our Fathers, is considered a classic of social analysis and general scholarship. Howe explores the socialist Jewish New York from which he came. He examines the dynamic of Eastern European Jews and the culture they created in America. World of our Fathers won the 1977 National Book Award in History and the National Jewish Book Award in the History category.

He also edited and translated many Yiddish stories and commissioned the first English translation of Isaac Bashevis Singer for the Partisan Review. In that regard, he was critical of Philip Roth's early works, Goodbye Columbus and Portnoy's Complaint, as philistine and vulgar caricatures of Jewish life that pandered to the worst anti-semitic stereotypes.

In 1987, Howe was a recipient of a MacArthur Fellowship.

Death
He died in New York of cardiovascular disease.

Legacy
He had strong political views that he would ferociously defend. Morris Dickstein, a professor at Queens College referred to Howe as a "counterpuncher who tended to dissent from the prevailing orthodoxy of the moment, whether left or right, though he himself was certainly a man of the left."

Leon Wieseltier, who was the literary editor of The New Republic, said of Howe: "He lived in three worlds, literary, political and Jewish, and he watched all of them change almost beyond recognition."

And Richard Rorty, American philosopher of note, dedicated his well-known work, Achieving Our Country (1999), to Howe's memory.

He appeared as himself in Woody Allen's mockumentary Zelig.

Howe had two children, Nina and Nicholas (1953-2006), with his second wife, Thalia Phillies, a classicist.

He is survived by his third wife, Ilona Howe.

Works

Books
Authored
Smash the Profiteers: Vote for Security and a Living Wage. New York: Workers Party Campaign Committee, 1946.
Don't Pay More Rent! Long Island City, NY: Workers Party Publications, 1947. Printed for the Workers Party of the United States.
The UAW and Walter Reuther. Co-authored with B. J. Widick. New York: Random House, 1949.
Sherwood Anderson. New York: Sloane, 1951.
William Faulkner: A Critical Study. New York: Random House, 1952.
The American Communist Party: A Critical History, 1919-1957. Co-authored with Lewis Coser, with the assistance of Julius Jacobson. Boston: Beacon Press, 1957.
Politics and the Novel. New York: Horizon Press, 1957.
The Jewish Labor Movement in America: Two Views. Co-authored with Israel Knox. New York: Jewish Labor Committee, 1957.
Edith Wharton: A Collection of Critical Essays. Englewood Cliffs, NJ: Prentice-Hall, 1962.
T.E. Lawrence: The Problem of Heroism. The Hudson Review, Vol. 15, No. 3, 1962.
A World More Attractive: A View of Modern Literature and Politics. New York: Horizon Press, 1963.
Sherwood Anderson's Winesburg, Ohio. Washington, D.C.: Voice of America, 1964. American Novel Series #14
New Styles in "Leftism." New York: League for Industrial Democracy, 1965.
On the Nature of Communism and Relations with Communists. New York: League for Industrial Democracy, 1966.
Steady Work: Essays in the Politics of Democratic Radicalism, 1953-1966. New York: Harcourt, Brace & World, 1966.
Thomas Hardy. New York: Macmillan, 1967.
The Idea of the Modern in Literature and the Arts. New York: Horizon Press, 1967.
Literary Modernism. Greenwich, CT: Fawcett Publications, 1967.
Student Activism. Indianapolis: Bobbs-Merrill, 1967.
 Decline of the New. New York: Harcourt, Brace & World, 1970.
The Literature of America. Co-authored with Mark Schorer & Larzer Ziff. New York: McGraw-Hill, 1971. 
The Critical Point: On Literature and Culture. New York: Horizon Press, 1973.
 World of our Fathers: The Journey of the East European Jews to America and the Life They Found and Made. New York: Harcourt Brace Jovanovich, 1976.
New Perspectives: The Diaspora and Israel. Co-authored with Matityahu Peled. New York: Harcourt Brace Jovanovich, 1976
 Trotsky. London: Fontana Modern Masters, 1978.
 Leon Trotsky. New York: Viking Press, 1978
Celebrations and Attacks: Thirty Years of Literary and Cultural Commentary. New York: Horizon Press, 1979. 
The Threat of Conservatism. Co-authored with Gus Tyler & Peter Steinfels. New York: Foundation for the Study of Independent Social Ideas, 1980.
The Making of a Critic, Bennington, VT: Bennington College, 1982. Ben Belitt lectureship series, #5.
A Margin of Hope: An Intellectual Autobiography. Harcourt Brace Jovanovich, 1982. 
Socialism and America. San Diego: Harcourt Brace Jovanovich, 1985. 
The American Newness: Culture and Politics in the Age of Emerson. Cambridge, MA: Harvard University Press, 1986. 
 American Jews and Liberalism. Co-authored with Michael Walzer, Leonard Fein & Mitchell Cohen. New York: Foundation for the Study of Independent Social Ideas, 1986.
The Return of Terrorism. Bronx, NY: Lehman College of the City University of New York, 1989. Herbert H. Lehman memorial lecture, Lehman College publications, #22.
Selected Writings, 1950-1990 San Diego: Harcourt Brace, 1990.
A Critic's Notebook. Edited and introduced by Nicholas Howe. New York: Harcourt Brace, 1994.
The End of Jewish Secularism. New York: Hunter College of the City University of New York, 1995. Occasional papers in Jewish history and thought, #1.

Edited
Gissing, George. New Grub Street. Boston: Houghton Mifflin, 1962.
Poverty: Views from the Left. Edited with Jeremy Larner. New York: Apollo, 1962.
The Basic Writings of Trotsky. New York: Random House, 1963.
The Radical Papers. New York: Doubleday, 1966.
Shoptalk: An Instructor's Manual for Classics of Modern Fiction: Eight Short Novels. New York: Harcourt, Brace & World, 1968.
 Beyond the New Left. New York: McCall Publishing Co., 1970. 
The New Conservatives: A Critique From the Left. Edited with Lewis A. Coser. New York: Quadrangle/The New York Times Book Co., 1974. 
Yiddish Stories: Old and New. Edited with Eliezer Greenberg. New York: Avon Books, 1977. 
The Best of Sholem Aleichem. Edited with Ruth R. Wisse. Washington: New Republic Books, 1979. 
How We Lived: A Documentary History of Immigrant Jews in America, 1880-1930. Edited with Kenneth Libo. New York: R. Marek, 1979.
The Portable Kipling. New York: Viking Press, 1982.
Beyond the Welfare State. New York: Schocken Books, 1982.
Short Shorts: An Anthology of the Shortest Stories. Edited with Ilana Wiener Howe. Boston, MA: D.R. Godine, 1982.
1984 Revisited: Totalitarianism in Our Century. New York: Harper & Row, 1983. 

Contributed
“Introduction.” New Grub Street, by George Gissing. Boston: Houghton Mifflin, 1962.
”Notes on the Welfare State.” Poverty: Views from the Left, edited with Jeremy Larner. New York: Apollo, 1962, pp. 293–314.
”Introduction.” The Basic Writings of Trotsky, edited by Irving Howe. New York: Random House, 1963.
”Afterword.” An American Tragedy, by Theodore Dreiser. New York: Signet Classic, 1964.
”Are American Jews Turning to the Right?” The New Conservatives: A Critique From the Left, edited by Daniel Bell & Lewis A. Coser. New York: Quadrangle/The New York Times Book Co., 1974. 
”Introduction.” Short Shorts: An Anthology of the Shortest Stories. Edited with Ilana Wiener Howe. Boston, MA: D.R. Godine, 1982.

Translated
 Baeck, Leo. The Essence of Judaism, translated by Irving Howe and Victor Grubwieser. New York: Schocken Books, 1948.

Articles and introductions
A treasury of Yiddish stories, editor with Eliezer Greenberg New York, Viking Press, 1954.
Modern literary criticism: an anthology, editor, Boston, Beacon Press, 1958.
 "New York in the Thirties: Some Fragments of Memory," Dissent, vol.8, no.3 (Summer 1961), pp. 241–250.
The Historical Novel by Georg Lukacs; preface by Irving Howe, Boston: Beacon Press, 1963
Orwell's Nineteen eighty-four: text, sources, criticism editor, New York : Harcourt, Brace and World, 1963.
The Merry-Go-Round of Love and selected stories by Luigi Pirandello, trans. Frances Keene and Lily Duplaix, with a foreword by Irving Howe, New York, The New American Library of World Literature, 1964.
Jude the obscure by Thomas Hardy; edited with an introduction by Irving Howe, Boston: Houghton Mifflin, 1965.
Selected writings: stories, poems and essays. by Thomas Hardy; edited with an introduction by Irving Howe, Greenwich, Conn., Fawcett Publications, 1966.
Selected short stories of Isaac Bashevis Singer edited with an introduction by Irving Howe, New York, Modern Library, 1966.
The radical imagination; an anthology from Dissent Magazine editor, New York : New American Library, 1967.
A Dissenter's guide to foreign policy editor, New York : Praeger, 1968.
Classics of modern fiction; eight short novels editor, New York : Harcourt, Brace & World, 1968.
A treasury of Yiddish poetry, editor with Eliezer Greenberg New York, Holt, Rinehart and Winston, 1969.
Essential works of socialism editor, New York, Holt, Rinehart and Winston, 1970.
The literature of America; nineteenth century editor, New York, McGraw-Hill, 1970.
Israel, the Arabs, and the Middle East editor with Carl Gershman, New York, Quadrangle Books, 1970.
Voices from the Yiddish: essays, memoirs, diaries, editor with Eliezer Greenberg Ann Arbor, University of Michigan Press, 1972.
The seventies: problems and proposals, editor with Michael Harrington New York, Harper & Row, 1972.
The world of the blue-collar worker editor, New York, Quadrangle Books, 1972.
Yiddish stories, old and new, editor with Eliezer Greenberg New York, Holiday House 1974
Herzog by Saul Bellow text and criticism edited by Irving Howe, New York, Viking Press, 1976.
Jewish-American stories, editor, New York : New American Library, 1977.
Ashes out of hope: fiction by Soviet-Yiddish writers, editor with Eliezer Greenberg New York : Schocken Books, 1977.
Literature as experience: an anthology editor with John Hollander and David Bromwich, New York : Harcourt Brace Jovanovich, 1979.
Twenty-five years of Dissent: an American tradition compiled and with an introd. by Irving Howe, New York : Methuen, 1979.
1984 revisited: totalitarianism in our century editor, New York : Harper & Row, 1983.
Alternatives, proposals for America from the democratic left editor, New York : Pantheon Books, 1984.
We lived there, too: in their own words and pictures—pioneer Jews and the westward movement of America, 1630-1930 editor with Kenneth Libo, New York : St. Martin's/Marek, 1984.
The Penguin book of modern Yiddish verse edited by Irving Howe, Ruth Wisse and Chone Shmeruk New York, Viking Press, 1987
Oliver Twist by Charles Dickens, introduction New York: Bantam, 1990.
The castle by Franz Kafka, introduction London : David Campbell Publishers, 1992.
Little Dorrit by Charles Dickens, introduction London : David Campbell Publishers, 1992.

References

Further reading
Articles
 Rodden, John. “Remembering Irving Howe.” Salmagundi, No. 148/149, Fall 2005, pp. 243–257.

Books
 Alexander, Edward. Irving Howe: Socialist, Critic, Jew. Bloomington, IN: Indiana University Press, 1998.
 Rodden, John, (ed.) Irving Howe and the Critics: Celebrations and Attacks. Lincoln, NE: University of Nebraska Press, 2005.
 Sorin, Gerald. Irving Howe: A Life of Passionate Dissent. New York: New York University Press, 2002.

Primary sources
 Cain, William. "An Interview with Irving Howe." American Literary History, Vol.1, No.3 (Autumn 1989): 554-564.
 Howe, Irving. Politics and the Intellectual: Conversations with Irving Howe. Purdue University Press, 2010.
Interviews during the previous fifteen years.
 Libo, Kenneth. "My Work on World of Our Fathers." American Jewish History, Vol.88, No.4 (2000): 439-448. Online.
Memoir by his research assistant.
 Rodden, John (ed.) Irving Howe and the Critics: Celebrations and Attacks. University of Nebraska Press, 2005.
Essays and reviews written by his critics.

External links

Irving Howe Archive at marxists.org
Dissent, the quarterly Howe founded and edited
from The New York Intellectuals by Alan M. Wald
Arguing the World, 1998 PBS documentary film featuring Nathan Glazer, Irving Kristol, Daniel Bell, and Howe
 Irving Howe at Library of Congress Authorities — with 108 catalog records

1920 births
1993 deaths
American literary critics
American Marxists
American communists
Jewish activists
Brandeis University faculty
City College of New York alumni
Jewish American historians
American male non-fiction writers
Jewish socialists
MacArthur Fellows
National Book Award winners
Members of the Democratic Socialists of America
Writers from New York City
American Trotskyists
Historians of anarchism
Historians of communism
Historians of socialism
Members of the Workers Party (United States)
20th-century American historians
20th-century American male writers
Historians from New York (state)
Members of the American Academy of Arts and Letters